James Allen Yaw Odico (b Banjul 10 April 1952) is an Anglican bishop in Gambia: he is the current Bishop of Gambia.

Odico was educated at Immanuel College of Theology, Ibadan and ordained deacon in 1999 and priest in 2002. 
He served in Serekunda and Banjul. In 2014 he became Vicar general of the Anglican Diocese of Gambia; and in 2015, Deanof its cathedral, St Mary's.

References

Gambian bishops
1952 births
Living people
People from Banjul
Anglican bishops of Gambia and the Rio Pongas
21st-century Anglican bishops in Africa
Anglicanism in the Gambia
Anglican deans in Africa
Alumni of Immanuel College of Theology, Ibadan